Pyro is the name of two fictional characters appearing in American comic books published by Marvel Comics.

Known as St. John Allerdyce, Pyro is depicted as a recurring enemy of the X-Men and later becomes an agent of the U.S. government. He was created by Chris Claremont and John Byrne and introduced in The Uncanny X-Men #141 (January 1981) as part of the Brotherhood of Evil Mutants. Pyro has the mutant power to control fire. Pyro and the Brotherhood of Evil Mutants are the main antagonists in the X-Men story Days of Future Past  as they attempt to assassinate Senator Robert Kelly, which in an alternate timeline leads to a dystopic future where Mutants are hunted, killed or captured by the Sentinel robots. The assassination is thwarted, and at a later date the Brotherhood become agents of the US government in exchange for a full pardon, and the team becomes known as the Freedom Force.

In the 2000 film X-Men, Pyro was portrayed by Alexander Burton. Aaron Stanford took over the role in the two 20th Century Fox X-Men films X2, and X-Men: The Last Stand as an Americanized version called John Allerdyce.

Publication history

Created by writer Chris Claremont and artist/co-writer John Byrne, the St. John Allerdyce version of Pyro first appeared in The Uncanny X-Men #141 (January 1981).

As part of the Dawn of X initiative, Pyro subsequently starred in the Marauders series in October 2019 alongside Kitty Pryde, Iceman, Emma Frost, Storm and Bishop.

Fictional character biography

St. John Allerdyce
Born and raised in Sydney, Australia, St. John Allerdyce is a mutant who possesses the Elemental power to control fire and flame, though not generate it. He wears a flamethrower on his back to provide the flame which he then takes control of. His ability to manipulate flame emerged in his teens, but he was unable to find a practical use for it. After years of working in Southeast Asia as a journalist and novelist, Pyro met the mutant Mystique, who later recruited him to the Brotherhood of Evil Mutants as a professional criminal and subversive. With the Brotherhood of Evil Mutants, he attempted to assassinate Senator Robert Kelly, and first battled the X-Men. With the Brotherhood, he later battled the Avengers, and then the X-Men again. Though he never served under the team's original leader, Magneto, Pyro did work with the Brotherhood under the command of several of Magneto's subordinates who alternately supervised the group.

Mystique's Brotherhood later offered the team's services to the United States government in exchange for protection and an official pardon for its crimes, and was renamed Freedom Force. As part of their first mission, the team captured Magneto. With Freedom Force, he next captured the Avengers on behalf of the federal government. Later, he clashed with the original X-Factor in seeking to arrest Rusty Collins. With Freedom Force, he fought the X-Men in Dallas, and was present at the X-Men's apparent demise. With Freedom Force, he battled Cyclops and Marvel Girl, sought to arrest Rusty Collins again, battled the New Mutants, and finally arrested both Rusty and Skids. He and Blob under Spiral's orders attempted to capture a young mutant girl named Amanda, but were defeated by Daredevil. He later teamed with Blob and Avalanche against the Avengers during the "Acts of Vengeance".

During Freedom Force's final mission, the team confronts a group of Iraqi operatives known as Desert Sword in Kuwait. There are fatalities on both sides. Super Sabre is decapitated and Pyro kills Sword operative the Veil. Ultimately Freedom Force is defeated and Pyro and Blob are abandoned in Kuwait and captured. Blob and Pyro are forced to serve as bodyguards to the country's military commanders. Later, Toad buys their release. Blob and Pyro join the Toad's new Brotherhood of Evil Mutants, and with them battled X-Force.

Some years later, Pyro contracted the Legacy Virus, a fatal disease affecting mainly mutants. He went to great lengths to find a cure (encountering Cecilia Reyes at one point), several times at the expense of others, but was unsuccessful in his search and succumbed to the virus.<ref name="cable87">Cable (vol. 2) #87</ref> This was just after saving Senator Robert Kelly from a new Brotherhood of Evil Mutants. This act of heroism was also instrumental in changing Senator Kelly's opinion on mutants as a whole, and led to his decision to work toward peaceful co-existence between humans and mutants.

Despite his heroic death, Pyro is resurrected by means of the Transmode Virus to serve as part of Selene's army of deceased mutants.  Under the control of Selene and Eli Bard, he takes part in the assault on the mutant nation of Utopia.

Pyro was confirmed to have remained alive after the events of Necrosha, as he battled both the original adult Iceman and the time-displaced teenage version in an attack in New York City, the older Bobby Drake confirming to his younger self that Pyro was indeed the original Australian version back from the dead.

Pyro then joined a new Brotherhood of Mutants led by Magneto's clone, Joseph, though Joseph claimed to be Magneto. He briefly battled the X-Men, though when Joseph's identity had been revealed, Pyro attempted to defend him against his teammate Juggernaut. Pyro was swiftly knocked unconscious by a punch from Cyclops.

Pyro later travels to Krakoa and reveals that he was used as a lab-rat and was one of the first subjects to be resurrected by the "Five" and because of that he lost all memories of what he did after he was resurrected by Selene. He has since joined Kitty's team of Marauders.

Simon Lasker
Simon Lasker is an American teenage mutant who manifested pyrokinesis by accidentally burning down his high school building and killing everyone inside it. Suddenly appearing before him in the form of Professor X, a somehow-repowered Mesmero brainwashed him into becoming the new Pyro and to join his Brotherhood of Mutants which was secretly funded by anti-mutant activist Lydia Nance.

Pyro's first mission with the Brotherhood of Mutants was to kidnap Mayor Bill de Blasio and hold him hostage. The X-Men arrived and defeated the Brotherhood of Mutants who are then arrested by the arriving S.H.I.E.L.D. agents

As Lydia Nance still had a use for the Brotherhood of Mutants, she orchestrated Mesmero's escape from the Box. Mesmero once again lured Pyro and the second Avalanche into helping him out. They were to attack a yacht that was owned by the Heritage Initiative at the time of its fundraiser. They group fought the X-Men alongside the NYPD. The Brotherhood of Mutants got away and fell back to their base. When Mesmero stated that the Brotherhood of Mutants are still under Lydia Nance's paycheck, Pyro took his leave since he did not want to work for an anti-mutant activist. Avalanche then demanded from Mesmero to get Pyro's cut. After finding the Xavier Institute for Mutant Education and Outreach, Pyro revealed his history to the X-Men and wanted to join up with them. While Iceman was wary of this, Rogue vouched for him.

Pyro was revealed to be gay in X-Men Gold (vol. 2) #32, in a post-sex scene with Iceman, and withdrawn from the X-Men to help his mother.

Powers and abilities
St. John Allerdyce
Allerdyce is a mutant who has the Elemental power to manipulate flame by shaping it as he desires, increasing or decreasing its heat, intensity and size. He can Elementally manipulate the flame to do whatever he desires and sometimes induces it to take semi-solid form as an animate flame being. These creations, though capable of movement and of grasping or carrying solid objects, are not alive and do not think or act on their own.

The degree of concentration necessary for Pyro to manipulate a flame construct is directly proportional to the construct's size, power and flame. Though he cannot be burned by a flame which he is manipulating, Pyro can be harmed by any fire that he does not mentally control. It is generally accepted that he must be able to see a flame to take control of it (hence limiting his mental influence to approximately 100 yards). Any of Pyro's fiery creations will immediately revert to ordinary flame if he turns his interest from it. 

After his return Allerdyce's powers have increased in some ways, showing he can prevent the gunpowder in a loaded pistol from igniting as well as generate fires on his own accord, without need of a heat source or fuel generated ignition point to get malleable combustible substance.

Simon Lasker
Simon has the mutant ability to elementally generate, control and manipulate fire; similar to the original Pyro. But unlike Allerdyce; he seems capable of igniting fire on his own and does not require outside sources of existing flame to manipulate.

Other versions
Age of Apocalypse
In the Age of Apocalypse, Pyro is one of the many mutants imprisoned in Sinister's breeding pens for refusing to join his Elite Mutant Force and was apparently experimented on while there as he's seen capable of creating flames by himself, though he is not immune to being burned. He was later killed alongside Avalanche, Artemis, Phantazia and Newt when the five prisoners attempt to escape.

House of M
In the House of M, Pyro was a member of the mutant supremacist government in Australia. He works alongside the powerful Exodus. He works closely with Vanisher in the oppression of the human population. They gain the attention of the Hulk when his friends, a community of Aboriginal Australians, are harassed. Here Pyro retains his background as a writer and a sentimental side; he briefly crafts a tiny pixie out of the flame from a match, commenting to the Vanisher, "I used to write Gothic romances. I've got more layers than a parfait".

Marvel Adventures
In Marvel Adventures Spider-Man, the Human Torch shows up at Midtown High for a demonstration, but loses control of his powers. Spider-Man (then Peter Parker) spots a mysterious figure who turns out to be Pyro, who is manipulating Human Torch out of jealousy that he doesn't get credit for being a fire manipulator. Peter knocks him into the school swimming pool, where Human Torch knocks him out.

Marvel Zombies
Pyro is shown as a zombie twice in the Marvel Zombies reality. He is seen in the background along with a group of zombies trying to catch Blob. He is also seen fighting the X-Men alongside zombie versions of Freedom Force.

Ronin
Pyro works as a murderous mutant ninja for the Japanese-based Hellfire Club. He battles the X-Men alongside fellow ninja Iceman and Avalanche.

Ultimate Marvel
In Ultimate X-Men #80 Pyro is seen fighting the Friends of Humanity and meeting Nightcrawler. This Pyro is a member of the Ultimate Morlocks, and a supporter of Xavier's cause who tells Nightcrawler that he would have liked to have been a member of the X-Men. In issue #82 he is rescued from a Sentinel attack by Bishop and Storm, who recruit him as a member of their new team of X-Men. It is hinted by Bishop that the recruits are "legends" of the future, meaning that Pyro may have much potential. He briefly works undercover in the Mutant Liberation Front, after pretending to defect to their side.  Stryfe, the leader of the group, revealed his knowledge of Pyro's intentions but allows him to continue watching, but eventually Stryfe abandons most of the Front, including Pyro, at the mercy of some approaching Sentinels. Pyro is later rescued by Beast, and aids the team in defeating the Sentinels.

Bishop dies in Ultimate X-Men #90 and Xavier returns alive from the future. Pyro moves into the Xavier Institute and becomes one of Xavier's X-Men. Pyro begins wondering if he belongs at the Institute and Wolverine assures him that he does.

Pyro has apparently defected from the Xavier Institute to Magneto's Brotherhood of Mutants, as he and Mastermind are shown capturing the superhero Valkyrie in The Ultimates 3 #4. It is as yet unknown how or why Pyro joined Magneto's Brotherhood. His face is not scarred and he is now immune to flame, despite previous portrayals.

During the confrontation, he and Mastermind find the unconscious Valkyrie. Pyro suggest they 'play' with her. The woman wakes up, slays Mastermind and despite Pyro's claims of innocence, cuts off his hands.

Ultimate Pyro, like his Age of Apocalypse counterpart, can generate flames without the aid of machines. He also is not as resistant to fire, as his face is horribly burned and most of his body is bandaged. At one point, he cauterizes a bullet wound by pressing flames against it. Because he burnt off his nerves, he does not feel pain.

In other media
Television
 An unidentified Pyro appears in X-Men: Pryde of the X-Men, voiced by Pat Fraley. This version is a member of the Brotherhood of Mutant Terrorists.
 The St. John Allerdyce incarnation of Pyro appears in X-Men: The Animated Series, voiced by Graham Halley. This version is a British member of Mystique's Brotherhood of Mutants.
 The St. John Allerdyce incarnation of Pyro appears in X-Men: Evolution, voiced by Trevor Devall. This version is initially a member of Magneto's Acolytes. Following Magneto's death and the Acolytes' disbandment, Pyro joins S.H.I.E.L.D. alongside the Brotherhood of Bayville in a vision of the future depicted in the two-part series finale "Ascension".
 The St. John Allerdyce incarnation of Pyro appears in Wolverine and the X-Men, initially as a prisoner of the Mutant Response Division before becoming a member of Magneto's Acolytes and subsequently imprisoned in Genosha for failing Magneto.
 An unidentified Pyro appears in The Super Hero Squad Show, voiced by Steve Blum. This version is a member of Doctor Doom's Lethal Legion and briefly joins forces with Paste Pot Pete and Zzzax to form Team Toxic.

Film

 Pyro appears as a member of Magneto's Brotherhood of Mutants in early drafts of X-Men, but had to be removed for the film to be greenlit by 20th Century Fox due to budget concerns. Despite this, Alexander Burton makes a brief cameo as the character in the final film as a student of the Xavier Institute.
 John Allerdyce / Pyro appears in X2, portrayed by Aaron Stanford. He is initially a friend of fellow Xavier Institute students Iceman and Rogue who keeps a Zippo lighter on him at all times before he is tempted by Magneto into joining the Brotherhood by the end of the film.
 John Allerdyce / Pyro appears in X-Men: The Last Stand, portrayed again by Aaron Stanford. Now sporting a miniature wrist-mounted flamethrower and serving as Magneto's right hand, he and the Brotherhood fight to stop a "mutant cure" from being produced until he is defeated by Iceman.

Video games
 An unidentified Pyro appears as a minor recurring boss in X-Men.
 An unidentified Pyro appears as a playable character in the Game Boy Color version of X-Men: Mutant Academy.
 An unidentified Pyro appears as a playable character in the Xbox version of X-Men: Next Dimension, voiced by Robin Atkin Downes.
 An unidentified Pyro appears as a boss in X-Men Legends, voiced by Robin Atkin Downes. This version is a member of the Brotherhood of Mutants.
 An unidentified Pyro appears as a playable character in the PC version of X-Men Legends II: Rise of Apocalypse, voiced by John Kassir. This version is a member of the Brotherhood of Mutants.
 An unidentified Pyro appears as a boss in X-Men: The Official Game, voiced by Steve Van Wormer.
 An unidentified Pyro appears in X-Men: Destiny, voiced by Steve Blum. This version is a member of the Brotherhood of Mutants.
 An unidentified Pyro appears as a boss in Marvel Heroes, voiced by Crispin Freeman. 
 An unidentified Pyro appears in Lego Marvel Super Heroes'', voiced by Nolan North. This version is a member of the Brotherhood of Mutants.

References

External links

Australian superheroes
Characters created by Chris Claremont
Characters created by John Byrne (comics)
Comics characters introduced in 1981
Fictional characters with fire or heat abilities
Fictional gay males
Fictional people from New South Wales
Fictional secret agents and spies in comics
Fictional writers
Male characters in comics
Marvel Comics LGBT superheroes
Marvel Comics male superheroes
Marvel Comics mutants
Marvel Comics supervillains
X-Men supporting characters